Emil Hoffmann Reif (born 5 March 1998), better known as Magisk (formerly Magiskb0Y), is a Danish professional Counter-Strike: Global Offensive player for Team Vitality. He has won three majors in total, all in a row, a record tied with only his teammates.

Career

2015–2016 
Magisk started his career floating around low-level Danish teams, before joining SK Gaming along with Andreas "MODDII" Fridh, Asger "AcilioN" Larsen, Michael "Friis" Jørgensen, and Casper "cadiaN" Møller.  The team was not very successful together, however, and the roster was soon dropped in favour of the Brazilian Luminosity Gaming.  Magisk eventually transferred to Dignitas, replacing Jesper "TENZKI" Plougmann, and joining Mathias "MSL" Lauridsen,  Kristian "k0nfig" Wienecke, René "cajunb" Borg, and Ruben "RUBINO" Villarroel.  The team found moderate success, culminating in a win at EPICENTER 2016.  Magisk won an EVP at the event, and ended up on the HLTV top 20 players of the year, being nominated for 14th place.

2017 
In early 2017, Dignitas was signed by F.C. Copenhagen in a new team known as North.  After signing aizy in place of RUBINO, the team would struggle to find success.  In July, North elected to replace Magisk with Valdemar "valde" Bjørn Vangså as the former's form declined after the addition of aizy and ensuing change of roles within the team.  Magisk joined OpTic's new European roster, which was formed off of other benched players from European rosters.

2018–2019 
Optic found little success, and in early January, Magisk was signed by Denmark's number one team at that time, Astralis.  Despite questions regarding the signing at the time, Magisk turned out to be the player Astralis needed for success.  Astralis went on to win 12 events in 2018 and early 2019, including 2 majors and the Intel Grand Slam, and following this, many people described Astralis as the greatest CS:GO team of all time.  For Magisk, who was the 3rd best player on Astralis, 2018 was another very good individual year, and he received the 7th spot on HLTV's top 20.  Magisk became the 14th major MVP from HLTV at the IEM Katowice 2019 Major.

2021
Magisk left Astralis in December 2021, along with Peter "dupreeh" Rasmussen and coach Danny "zonic" Sørensen.

2022
On 5 January 2022, Team Vitality announced the signing of Magisk, along with Peter "⁠dupreeh⁠" Rasmussen and Danny "⁠zonic⁠" Sørensen.

Individual awards 
MVP of BLAST Pro Series: Lisbon 2018
MVP of IEM Katowice Major 2019
HLTV Top 20 Players: 14th (2016), 7th (2018), 5th (2019)

References

External links 

 Magisk on Twitter

Astralis players
Counter-Strike players
Danish esports players
1998 births
Living people